Susanna and the Elders is a 1652 painting by the Italian artist Artemisia Gentileschi. It currently hangs in the Pinacoteca Nazionale, Bologna. The painting, over two metres broad, was completed in collaboration with Gentileschi's pupil Onofrio Palumbo - documents relating to the sale of the painting mention a payment to Palumbo.

It is one of many paintings by Gentileschi that depicts the story of Susanna from the Book of Daniel. Her first was completed when she was seventeen and around the time she was raped by one of her father's students; this particular painting was done when she was approaching sixty years old and is her last known dated work.

Description
The story derives from the biblical book of Daniel, in which a virtuous woman is set upon by two lustful older men. They surprise her while she is bathing and demand that she submit to their lewd intentions, threatening to publicly accuse her if she does not. The theme was commonly used in art from the 16th century and was often used as an opportunity to portray the nude female form. In contrast to the version that Gentileschi painted at the start of her career, this version shows Susannah in a more theatrical pose, deflecting the men's advances rather than shrinking away.

A faint signature and date have been detected on the lower left at the base of the balustrade.

Provenance
Bank records indicate that a version of Susannah was sold to Antonio Galise in early 1653; historians believe it to be this version. It can then be traced to the Medici collection at the Palazzo Medici Riccardi by 1774. By 1945 it was in the Azzolini collection as a work by Elisabetta Sirani, from which it was left to the Italian nation and designated for the regional gallery in Bologna. Recent restoration and investigation have led to the attribution to Gentileschi rather than Sirani.

Other versions of Susanna by Artemisia Gentileschi

See also 

 Susanna and the Elders in art

References

Sources 

1650 paintings
Paintings by Artemisia Gentileschi
Gentileschi